The 9th Jat Regiment was an infantry regiment of the British Indian Army. It was formed in 1922, after the Indian government reformed the army, moving from single battalion regiments to multi battalion regiments.

World War II
The Regiment saw a great deal of fighting with the Jats showing their mettle in North Africa, Ethiopia, Burma, Malaya, Singapore, and Java-Sumatra. A large number of gallantry awards were won including a Victoria Cross (by Jemadar Abdul Hafiz) and two George Crosses (by Islam-ud-Din and Abdul Rahman). At the end of the war the Regiment, in company with other regiments of the Indian Infantry, dropped the numeral 9 from its title and became simply the Jat Regiment. After independence it was allocated to the new Indian Army. The Regiment at independence had about 1/4th or 25% Muslims recruited from Panwar Rajput Muslims from around Rohtak and Hisar, Haryana and from Muslim Jats in Montgomery and Okara in West Punjab, in all-Muslim companies of the 10th Jats and 6th Jat Light Infantry. The Muslim companies and platoons were merged into the Bahawalpur Regiment and the 130th Baluchis as the families of the soldiers moved to Pakistan upon partition. They were replaced by widened recruitment of Haryana Gujjars and Ahirs from around Rohtak and Gurgaon.

Formation
1st Battalion ex 6th Jat Light Infantry
2nd Battalion ex 119th Infantry (The Mooltan Regiment)
3rd Battalion ex 10th Jats
4th Battalion ex 18th Infantry
10th (Training) Battalion ex 2nd Battalion, 6th Jat Light Infantry

Formed in World War II
7th Battalion
8th Battalion
9th Battalion
14th Battalion
15th Battalion

See also
 Jat people
 Jat Regiment
 List of Jats
 Jat Mahasabha
 World Jat Aryan Foundation
 Dev Samhita
 Origin of Jat people from Shiva's Locks
 Jat reservation agitation
 20th Lancers
 10th Jats
 14th Murray's Jat Lancers
 6th Jat Light Infantry

References

Sources

British Indian Army infantry regiments
Military units and formations established in 1922
R
R